"It's My Party" is a song by American singer-songwriter Lesley Gore from her debut studio album I'll Cry If I Want To (1963). It was released as the lead single from the album on April 5, 1963, by Mercury Records. The song was collectively written by Herb Wiener, John Gluck Jr., and Wally Gold, whilst production was helmed by Quincy Jones.

Theme
The song lyrically portrays the discomfort of a teenage girl at her birthday party when her boyfriend Johnny disappears, only to return in the company of Judy, another girl, who is "wearing his ring", to indicate he has replaced the birthday girl as his love interest.

"It's My Party" is in the key of A major. The song's effectiveness is enhanced by several musical touches that producer Quincy Jones incorporated, including Latin-sounding rhythms, double tracked vocals, and effective horn parts. Allmusic critic Jason Ankeny wrote of the song, It's My Party' remains one of the most vivid evocations of adolescent heartbreak ever waxed – Quincy Jones produced the record, although you'd swear it was Aaron Spelling instead."

Background
"It's My Party" was credited to John Gluck, Wally Gold and Herb Weiner, staff writers at the Aaron Schroeder Music firm in 1962.  The lyrics were actually written by Seymour Gottlieb, a freelance songwriter.  He gave the lyrics to Herb Weiner, with whom he partnered in writing songs, to peddle.  It was based on actual events relating to Gottlieb's daughter Judy's "sweet sixteen" party, before which she cried over the prospect of her grandparents being invited. The demo for the song was cut by Barbara Jean English, a girl group veteran (the Clickettes, the Fashions), who was then working as a receptionist at the firm. She also worked with Jimmy Radcliffe, serving as the firm's in-house demo singer.  Radcliffe produced the demo, and, according to English, "tried to persuade Musicor [the label owned by Aaron Schroeder] to release it as a record, or to take me into a master studio and redo it, but they weren't interested".

The song was also recorded by Helen Shapiro for her Helen in Nashville album in February 1963, with Shapiro's regular producer, Norrie Paramor, and also Al Kasha. Shapiro later recalled: "Right from the first time we heard the song on the rough demo back in London, we thought we were going to sock them between the eyes with that one";
however, Shapiro's version was not one of the cuts chosen as an advance single from the album and by the time of the album's release that October the "It's My Party" track was perceived as a cover of Lesley Gore's hit.

Lesley Gore recalls that "It's My Party" was among some two hundred demos producer Quincy Jones brought to review with her in the den of her family home in February 1963. On hearing "It's My Party", Gore told Jones: "That's not half bad. I like it. Good melody. Let's put it on the maybe pile." The song proved to be the only demo Gore and Jones found agreeable. With Jones producing and Claus Ogerman handling arranging and conducting duties, Gore recorded "It's My Party" at Bell Sound Studios in Manhattan on March 30, 1963.

In March 1963, Phil Spector heard the demo of "It's My Party" while visiting Aaron Schroeder's office. Wally Gold later recalled: "He [Spector] said, 'Great, I love it. I'm gonna do it with the Crystals.' We [the song's writers] were really excited, because that would ensure that the record was #1!" Schroeder apparently only learned of the Lesley Gore recording of "It's My Party" when Quincy Jones invited him to hear the completed track, which Schroeder found formulaic; believing that Spector would be able to cut a much stronger version of the song with the Crystals and not wanting to lose Spector's good will, Schroeder attempted to convince Jones to suppress the track. Schroeder did not mention Spector's version to Jones, but Jones and Spector both happened to attend a concert with Charles Aznavour at Carnegie Hall on the evening of March 30, 1963, and when they met outside it came up in conversation that Spector had recorded a version of "It's My Party" with the Crystals. Jones skipped the concert, instead spending that night – a Saturday – at Bell Sound Studios making a test pressing of the track, comprising one hundred copies.

Over the next two days, Jones mailed these out to radio programmers in key markets across the US. Gore heard her record played on the radio for the first time that Friday; the official release of "It's My Party" came later in the month, with the disc ascending to number one nationally in four weeks. Jones was abroad at the time of "It's My Party"'s release. On his return, he expressed dismay when Aaron Schroeder advised him that the rush release of "It's My Party" had precluded coining a more pleasant name for the singer than "Lesley Gore", to which Schroeder replied: "Didn't anybody tell you?... Quince, the record's number one. Do you really give a damn what her last name is?" 

Reviewing the song, Cash Box said that Gore "has a slick, wide-range voice aptly suited to the tune, a medium-paced, chorus-backed romancer with a potent teen-oriented multi-dance beat."

In 1980, WCBN-FM, the University of Michigan freeform student radio station, played "It's My Party" for 18 hours straight the day after Ronald Reagan was elected.

In 1999, the song was used as an advertising jingle to promote Burger King's 99-cent meal. 

In August 2021, a trend of using a remixed version of the song in videos on video-sharing app TikTok led to a resurgence of interest in the song.

Charts

Weekly charts

Year-end charts

Dave Stewart and Barbara Gaskin version

In 1981, a remake by British artists Dave Stewart and Barbara Gaskin was a UK number-one hit single for four weeks, becoming the first version of the song to reach number one in the UK. The cover also reached number one in Ireland and New Zealand and reached the top 10 in Australia, Austria, Germany, South Africa, and Switzerland. The music video for the Stewart/Gaskin version contained a cameo by Thomas Dolby as Johnny, Judy being played by Gaskin in a blond wig.

Charts

Weekly charts

Year-end charts

Other versions

In 1977, Carroll Baker had a number one country hit in Canada with her version of "It's My Party".
In 2010, Amy Winehouse recorded 'It's My Party' for a Quincy Jones tribute album "Soul Bossa Nostra". 
In 2015, Melanie Martinez released Pity Party. The track uses an interpolation of the chorus from "It's My Party".

Sequel
Because of the pop cultural obsession with the song and its tragic nature, Gore recorded a sequel, "Judy's Turn to Cry". In this song, the teenage girl narrator gets her revenge on Judy. In the lyrics the narrator explicitly finds "foolish" how much she cried when she saw Johnny and Judy together, and seems determined to start anew. But after she kisses another boy at another party, Johnny gets jealous, punches the other boy and returns to her. Following just two months on the heels of "It's My Party", the sequel reached number five on the charts.

Charts

Weekly charts

Year-end charts

Notes

References

External links
 

Songs about parties
Songs about infidelity
1962 songs
1963 debut singles
1981 singles
Lesley Gore songs
Dave Stewart (keyboardist) songs
Carroll Baker songs
Billboard Hot 100 number-one singles
Cashbox number-one singles
Number-one singles in New Zealand
UK Singles Chart number-one singles
Irish Singles Chart number-one singles
Song recordings produced by Quincy Jones
Mercury Records singles
Stiff Records singles
Songs written by Wally Gold
Helen Shapiro songs
Lill-Babs songs
Amy Winehouse songs